Hirabayashi is a Japanese surname. Notable people with the surname include:

, Japanese boxer
 Gordon Hirabayashi (1918–2012), American sociologist 
, Japanese writer 
 Asako Hirabayashi (born 1960), Asian-American contemporary composer and harpsichordist

See also
 Hirabayashi v. United States (1943), a United States Supreme Court case 
 Hirabayashi v. United States (1987), a case overturning conviction of Gordon Hirabayashi
 Hirabayashi Station (disambiguation), railway stations in Niigata and Osaka, Japan 
 6390 Hirabayashi, a main-belt asteroid

Japanese-language surnames